Frye's Inn is an early 19th-century stagecoach inn and tavern near the "Capon Bridge" that crosses the Cacapon River in Capon Bridge, West Virginia.

History
Frye's Inn, located on the east side of the Cacapon River, was constructed between 1800 and 1818 by Margaret Caudy and her husband Eli Beall. Originally known as Beall's Tavern, the log structure became a haven for early pioneers and stagecoach travelers headed west on the Northwestern Turnpike (presently U.S. Route 50). Beall's daughter Sarah Jane married a man with the surname Frye and this marriage between the Beall and Frye families resulted in the tavern's name change to Frye's Inn.

During the American Civil War, General Stonewall Jackson of the Confederate States Army and his men paused to pray under the large walnut tree directly opposite the inn along the turnpike. This event was later recounted by Jenny Frye in a local newspaper.

The inn currently serves as the private residence of Thomas Kipps of Capon Bridge.

See also 
List of historic sites in Hampshire County, West Virginia

References

External links 

American Civil War sites in West Virginia
Hampshire County, West Virginia, in the American Civil War
Houses completed in 1818
Houses in Hampshire County, West Virginia
I-house architecture in West Virginia
Northwestern Turnpike
Restaurants established in 1818
Taverns in West Virginia
Capon Bridge, West Virginia
1818 establishments in Virginia